Trencrom is a hamlet south of St Ives, Cornwall, England, United Kingdom.

See also

Trencrom Hill

References

Hamlets in Cornwall